Tmesorrhina iris are beetles from the family Scarabaeidae, subfamily Cetoniinae.

Description
Tmesorrhina iris can reach a length of 22–24 mm. The basic colour of this species is dark green. The elytra are elongate, subparallel and punctured with black punctures. The legs are reddish brown.

Distribution
This species can be found in the rainforests of the Afrotropical region (Ivory Coast, Ghana, Cameroon, Nigeria, Central African Republic, Uganda and Democratic Republic of Congo).

Subspecies
 Tmesorrhina iris camerunica
 Tmesorrhina iris moseri
 Tmesorrhina iris saundersi
 Tmesorrhina iris schultzei

References
 Global species
 Encyclopedia of Life

External links
 Flower-beetles

Cetoniinae
Beetles described in 1781